Punta San Cataldo di Lecce Lighthouse is an active lighthouse located on the eastern point of San Cataldo di Lecce in the Salentine Peninsula  from Lecce on the Adriatic Sea.

History
The first plan to build a lighthouse was signed on February 25, 1865, in the meantime a temporary light was installed on a building of property of the municipality. In February 1893 the final design was approved and on December 31, 1895, the construction of the keeper's house and the lighthouse were completed and activated definitely in 1897.

Description
The lighthouse is completely automated and is managed by the Marina Militare with the identification code number 3612 E.F.

See also
 List of lighthouses in Italy
 Lecce

References

External links
 Servizio Fari Marina Militare

Lighthouses in Italy